The Karlovy Vary Region or Carlsbad Region (German: Karlsbader Region) is an administrative unit of the Czech Republic, located in the westernmost part of its historical region of Bohemia. It is named after its capital Karlovy Vary. Spas in the region include Karlovy Vary and Mariánské Lázně.

Administrative divisions
The Karlovy Vary Region is divided into 3 districts:

At a lower level, the region has 134 municipalities, comprising 56 in the Karlovy Vary District, 40 in the Cheb District and 38 in the Sokolov District.

Population
Karlovy Vary Region is the smallest region in the Czech Republic with a population of less than 300,000. Only 11 municipalities have populations greater than 5,000. The largest municipality of the region is Karlovy Vary with a population of around 50,000. The table below shows the municipalities in Karlovy Vary Region with the largest population (as of 1 January 2019):

Other significant towns in Karlovy Vary Region are Nejdek, Kraslice, Františkovy Lázně and Horní Slavkov.

Economy

Spas
The region is responsible over half of the county's spa industry. Twelve spas are in the city of Karlovy Vary. Other spa towns in the region include Františkovy Lázně, Mariánské Lázně, Lázně Kynžvart and Jáchymov. The spas are visited by Czechs as well as by people from the rest of Europe, Russia, Israel and North America. The Karlovy Vary spa wafer, a local food item, was awarded protected designation of origin (PDO) status by the European Commission in 2011.

The water from the region is used in locally produced beverages including Mattoni from Karlovy Vary and Aquila from the village of Kyselka.

Black Triangle
The region is the home of two power stations, Vřesová and Tisová, both in the Sokolov District.  The region is also part of the so-called Black Triangle, an area of heavy industrialization and environmental damage on the three-way border of Poland, Germany, and the Czech Republic.

Transport
The Karlovy Region is served by Karlovy Vary Airport, which handled more than 100,000 passengers in 2012. The region is also home to two other airports, neither of which are used for passenger flights. These are Cheb Airport, the oldest airport in the country, and Mariánské Lázně Airport.

The region lacks any motorways. The unfinished R6 expressway passes through the region, linking Cheb and Karlovy Vary to Prague.

Education
The Czech University of Life Sciences Prague opened a centre in the village of Dalovice in the Karlovy Vary District in 2007. The private College of Karlovy Vary is also located in the region, in addition to regional centres of the Banking Institute / College of Banking in Karlovy Vary and the University of West Bohemia in Cheb and Sokolov.

References

External links
 Official website
 Karlovy Vary photos and sights to visit

 
Regions of the Czech Republic